The Campeonato Argentino de Rugby 1960 was won by the selection of Buenos Aires Province ("Provincia") that beat in the final the selection of Capital.

In this edition, made his first appearance the selection of Rio Negro y Neuquén, while disappear the selection of La Plata, encapsulated in the "Provincia".
The semifinals was not played as usual in Buenos Aires, but in Rosario and Tucuman.

Rugby Union in Argentina in 1960 
 France national rugby union team visited South America, playing 13 matches, all won. 11 of the matches was played in Argentina, with 3 test against Argentina

 The Buenos Aires Champsionship was won by C.A.S.I.
 The Cordoba Province Championship was won by Universitario
 The North-East Championship was won by Uni Tucuman

Knock out stages

Semifinals 

 Rosario: E. García, E. España, J. Pellejero, J.Caballero, J. Dimasse, O. Aletta, J. Ruiz, A. Paván, E. Kaden, R. Cerfoglio (cap.), A. Colla, E. Paquez, M. Chesta, N. Robson, R. Esmendi.
 Capital: J. Lafleur, E. Krossler, A. Álvarez, L. Méndez, C. Salinas, A. Guastella (cap.), A. Sáenz Valiente, E. Gaviña, H. Vidou, G. McCormick, J. Lumi, W. Bunge, D. Churchill Browne, L. Sutton, R. Hogg. 

 Norte: C. Ponce, Campos, J. Terán, Peiró, J. Esteban, J. Nucci, A. Frías Silva, Silva, M. Arcuri, E. Medina, J. Paz, C. Diambra, R. Terán Vega, J. Centurión, J. Ritorto. 
, Provincia: J. Ríos, E. Neri, R. Oliveri, J. Guidi, R. Magnani, J. Cam¬pos, E. Holmgren, G. Montes de Oca, A. Salinas, E. Mitchelstein, R. Schmidt, B. Otaño, W. Aniz, J. Casanegra, E. Sorhaburu.

Final

 Provincia: J. Ríos, E. Neri, J. Guidi, R. Oliveri, R. Magnani, I. Co¬mas, E. Holmgren, G. Montes de Oca, A. Salinas (cap.), E. Mit¬chelstein, R. Schmidt, B. Otaño, E. Sorhaburu, J. Casanegra, W. Aniz
 Capital: J. Lafleur, E. Krossler, L. Méndez, E. Karplus, C. Salinas, A. Guastella (cap.), A. Sáenz Valiente, R. Hogg, D. Churchill Brow¬ne, L. Sutton, J. Lumi, W Bunge, E. Gaviña, H. Vidou, G. Mac Cormick

Bibliography 
  Memorias de la UAR 1960
  XVI Campeonato Argentino
 Rugby Archive

Campeonato Argentino de Rugby
Argentina
rugby